Muhammad Asad Malik (October 30, 1941 – July 27, 2020) was a Pakistani field hockey player. He won a silver medal at the 1964 Summer Olympics, a gold medal at the 1968 Summer Olympics in Mexico City, and a silver medal at the 1972 Summer Olympics in Munich.

Death
Malik died on July 27, 2020, at the age of 78, during a road accident.

Awards and recognition
 Pride of Performance Award by the President of Pakistan in 1969

References

External links
 
 

1941 births
2020 deaths
Pakistani male field hockey players
Olympic field hockey players of Pakistan
Olympic gold medalists for Pakistan
Olympic medalists in field hockey
Medalists at the 1964 Summer Olympics
Medalists at the 1968 Summer Olympics
Medalists at the 1972 Summer Olympics
Field hockey players at the 1964 Summer Olympics
Field hockey players at the 1968 Summer Olympics
Field hockey players at the 1972 Summer Olympics
Asian Games medalists in field hockey
Field hockey players at the 1962 Asian Games
Field hockey players at the 1966 Asian Games
Field hockey players at the 1970 Asian Games
Asian Games gold medalists for Pakistan
Asian Games silver medalists for Pakistan
Olympic silver medalists for Pakistan
Medalists at the 1962 Asian Games
Medalists at the 1966 Asian Games
Medalists at the 1970 Asian Games
Recipients of the Pride of Performance
Road incident deaths in Pakistan
20th-century Pakistani people